Banner of Love is a song by Christian Contemporary-Ambient-Rock band Luminate from their second album, Welcome to Daylight. It was released on July 24, 2012, as the first single from the album.

Background 
This song was produced by Christopher Stevens.

Composition 
"Banner of Love" was written by Samuel Hancock, Cody Clark and Dustin DeLong.

Release 
The song "Banner of Love" was digitally released as the lead single from Welcome to Daylight on July 24, 2012.

Critical reception

Uses 
"Banner of Love" appears of the compilation album WOW Hits 2013.

Weekly Charts

References 

2012 singles
2012 songs
Sparrow Records singles